PLO is the Palestine Liberation Organization, an organization for the creation of the independent State of Palestine.

PLO may also refer to:

 Pot Limit Omaha, a poker variant
 People's Law Office, a law office in America
 Plo Koon, a fictional character in Star Wars
 Port Lincoln Airport
Pregnancy- and lactation-associated osteoporosis, a rare form of osteoporosis

See also
 Palestine Liberation Army, the military wing of the Palestine Liberation Organization
 PL/0, a computer programming language